Dehnow-e Salehabad (also Romanized as Dehnow-e Şāleḥābād) is a village in Chahdegal Rural District, Negin Kavir District, Fahraj County, Kerman Province, Iran. At the 2006 census, its population was 149, in 44 families.

References 

Populated places in Fahraj County